The 1902 Navy Midshipmen football team represented the United States Naval Academy during the 1902 college football season. In their second season under head coach Art Hillebrand, the Midshipmen compiled a 2–7–1 record and were outscored by opponents by a combined score of 99 to 35.

Schedule

References

Navy
Navy Midshipmen football seasons
Navy Midshipmen football